Dylan Louiserre (born 2 February 1995) is a French footballer who plays for Guingamp as a midfielder.

Club career
He started his professional career with Le Havre, and played for Avranches on loan during the 2016–17 season. Louiserre left Niort at the end of the 2021–22 season having made 137 appearances for the club in all competitions.

In June 2022, Louiserre signed with Guingamp.

Personal life
Louiserre is of Guadeloupean descent.

Career statistics

References

External links

 

1995 births
Living people
French people of Guadeloupean descent
French footballers
France youth international footballers
Le Havre AC players
US Avranches players
Chamois Niortais F.C. players
En Avant Guingamp players
Ligue 2 players
Championnat National players
Championnat National 2 players
Championnat National 3 players
Association football midfielders